Pyotr Dmitryvich Telezhnikov (birth surname Schreider; born 31 March 1863) was an Imperial Russian division, corps and army commander. He was made a Poruchik in 1886, a Stabskapitän in 1890, a captain in 1892, a Podpolkovnik (lieutenant colonel) in 1896, a Polkovnik (colonel) in 1900 and a major general in 1909. He fought in the war against the Empire of Japan. He retained his original German surname until the war against the German Empire and Austria-Hungary, when changed it to a Russian one. In October 1917, he left Minsk for Petrograd. After the October Revolution, he offered his services to the Soviet Red Army, where he was stationed at Yaroslavsky District, Yaroslavl Oblast from January to December 1919. He retired on August 7, 1920.

Awards 
Order of Saint Stanislaus (House of Romanov), 3rd class, 1898
Order of Saint Stanislaus (House of Romanov), 2nd class, 1899
Order of Saint Stanislaus (House of Romanov), 1st class, 1912
Order of Saint Anna, 3rd class, 1895
Order of Saint Anna, 2nd class, 1915
Order of Saint Vladimir, 4th class, 1904
Order of Saint Vladimir, 3rd class, 1905
Gold Sword for Bravery, 1906

Sources 
 

Russian military personnel of the Russo-Japanese War
Russian military personnel of World War I
Recipients of the Order of Saint Stanislaus (Russian), 3rd class
Recipients of the Order of Saint Stanislaus (Russian), 2nd class
Recipients of the Order of Saint Stanislaus (Russian), 1st class
Recipients of the Order of St. Anna, 3rd class
Recipients of the Order of St. Anna, 2nd class
Recipients of the Order of St. Vladimir, 4th class
Recipients of the Order of St. Vladimir, 3rd class
Recipients of the Gold Sword for Bravery
1863 births
20th-century deaths
Year of death unknown